Fanny "Bobbie" Rosenfeld (December 28, 1904 – November 14, 1969) was a Canadian athlete, who won a gold medal for the 100-metre relay and a silver medal for the 100-metre at the 1928 Summer Olympics in Amsterdam. In 1949, named Rosenfeld the "Canadian woman athlete of the half-century." The Bobbie Rosenfeld Award is named in her honour. In 1996, she was  inducted into the Ontario Sports Hall of Fame.

Personal life
Rosenfeld, who was Jewish, was born on December 18, 1904 in Ekaterinoslav, Russian Empire (now Dnipro, Ukraine). When she was an infant, she immigrated to Barrie, Canada with her parents and older brother. Her father, Max Rosenfeld, operated a junk business and her mother Sarah, who gave birth to three more girls, ran the home. 

Fanny attended Central School and Barrie Collegiate Institute, where she excelled in sports, including basketball, softball, lacrosse, hockey, and tennis.

In 1922, the Rosenfeld family moved to Toronto, where Fanny worked at a chocolate factory. 

Rosenfeld died on November 13, 1969, in Toronto and is buried at Lambton Mills Cemetery in Humber Valley Village.

Athletic career
Rosenfeld played and competed in numerous sports, including track and field, ice hockey, basketball, fastball, softball, lacrosse, golf, speed skating, and tennis. When commenting on Rosenfeld's diverse sporting career, one author wrote, "The most efficient way to summarize Bobbie Rosenfeld's career... is to say that she was not good at swimming."

In 1949, Rosenfeld was inducted into Canada's Sports Hall of Fame, one of the first women to receive the honor. In 1950, she was "bestowed the Canadian woman athlete of the first half-century award." 

In 1978, The Canadian Press began presenting the Bobbie Rosenfeld Award, an annual award given to Canada's female athlete of the year.

Basketball
After Rosenfeld's family moved to Toronto in 1922, she joined Toronto's Young Women's Hebrew Association (YWHA) and was a center for their basketball team. That year, the team won both the Toronto and Ontario championships.

Hockey
Rosenfeld was a hockey player in the 1920s and was dubbed superwoman of ladies' hockey.  In 1924, she helped form the Ladies Ontario Hockey Association (LOHA).

Rosenfeld competed on a championship hockey team after debuting as a track and field athlete at the 1928 Summer Olympics. She was a centre on the 1927 and 1929 Ontario champion Toronto Patterson Pats, which were part of the North Toronto Ladies' City League. She was considered the most outstanding women's hockey player in all of Ontario between 1931 and 1932.

Softball
Rosenfeld competed on a championship softball team after debuting as a track and field athlete at the 1928 Summer Olympics.

Tennis
In 1924, Rosenfeld claimed the title of the Toronto Ladies Grass Court Tennis championship, despite having only just taken up the sport.

Track and field
In 1923, Rosenfeld's softball teammates encouraged her to enter a track competition at a sporting carnival in Beaverton. She entered a  dash and defeated the Canadian champion, Rosa Grosse. Later that year, she began training more intensely and competed at the Canadian National Exhibition, as well as Ontario’s first women's track and field championship.

At the 1925 Ontario Ladies Track and Field championships, in a single day performance, Rosenfeld placed first in discus, shot put,  dash, low hurdles, and long jump, and placed second in the javelin and  dash. In the mid-1920s, she held national records in the  open relay with a CNE relay team, as well as in the standing broad jump, discus, javelin, and shot put.

Olympics 
During the trials for the 1928 Summer Olympics, Rosenfeld set numerous Canadian track and field records. These records included the running broad jump, standing broad jump and the discus. Her time in the 100 metres was four-fifths of a second slower than the world record at that time. 

She later competed as a sprinter in the 1928 Olympics, the first Games in which women were allowed to compete in track and field. Her team won  a gold medal in the 4 × 100 m relay. She received a silver medal in the  dash and placed fifth in the  dash. She "scored more points for her country than any other athlete at the Games, male or female."

Retirement 
One year after competing in the Olympic Games, Rosenfeld developed severe arthritis,  The condition forced her to stop competing in 1933, though she continued to be involved in sports as "a coach, executive or manager to various women's sports teams."

Sport involvement 
In 1934, Rosefeld was coach of the Canadian women's track and field team at the British Commonwealth Games in London, England. 

From 1934 to 1939, Rosenfeld was president of the Ladies Ontario Hockey Association. By late 1936, she served as the organization's president, secretary, and treasurer. From 1937 to 1939, she also served as president of the Dominion Women's Amateur Hockey Association, following Myrtle Cook-McGowan and succeeded by Mary Dunn.

In the spring of 1939, Rosenfeld was the manager of Langley's Lakesides softball team. The team played an exhibition game in front of 14,000 fans at Madison Square Garden.

Journalism 
In 1937, Rosenfeld turned her attention to journalism. She worked as a sports columnist forThe Globe and Mail for approximately twenty years, advocating for greater participation of women in sports and more girls' physical education programs in schools. In 1937, she introduced a column called "Feminine Sports Reel," where she "covered not only sports news, but also countered the stereotype  that sports made women unfeminine." For 18 years, Rosenfeld covered women's sports. Her last column appeared on December 3, 1958, but she continued to work for the newspaper until 1966.

Quotes 
"Athletic maids to arms! ... We are taking up the sword, and high time it is in defense of our so-called athletic bodies to give the lie to those pen flourishers who depict us not as paragons of feminine physique, beauty and health, but rather as Amazons and ugly ducklings all because we have become sports-minded." – Fanny Bobbie Rosenfeld (Jewish Women's Archives)

Awards and honours
1924 – Toronto grass-courts tennis championship title
Five first place and two second place titles at Ontario Ladies' Track and Field Championships
World record (since broken), . dash (11.0 seconds)
1931 – Leading home run hitter in softball league
1931–32 – Most outstanding woman hockey player in Ontario
1949 – inducted into Canada's Sports Hall of Fame
In 1949, The Canadian Press named Rosenfeld the Canadian Woman Athlete of the Half-Century.
In 1996, she was inducted into the Ontario Sports Hall of Fame.

Legacy

1976 – recognized by the Canadian Historic Sites and Monuments Board as a national historic person
 1991 – Bobbie Rosenfeld Park – a park and open space located between the Rogers Centre and the CN Tower in Toronto
City of Toronto government plaque honouring the athlete in a planter at the foot of the CN Tower.
 Government of Canada plaque at Allandale Recreation Centre in Barrie, Ontario in honour of the athlete who settled and grew up in the city.
1996 – commemorative stamp issued by Canada Post
 The official website of the 2012 Summer Olympics states her as the first Ukraine-born gold medal winner.
Bobbie Rosenfeld trophy awarded by the Canadian Press each year to Canada's Female Athlete of the Year.
On December 28, 2022, Google released a doodle for the 118th birthday of Rosenfeld in Canada.

See also
List of select Jewish track and field athletes

References

Books
 Anne Dublin, Bobbie Rosenfeld: The Olympian who Could Do Everything, Second Story Press, Toronto, 2004, code 
Cruxton J Bradley and Wilson, W. Douglas "Spotlight Canada: Fourth Edition"

External links

  Fanny "Bobbie" Rosenfeld in Jewish Women Encyclopedie, 2005 
   Bobbie Rosenfeld goes for the gold
 
 
 
 Fanny Rosenfeld at The Canadian Encyclopedia
 Bobbie Rosenfeld, Greatest Sporting Moments, Virtual Museum of Canada Exhibit
 
 
 

1904 births
1969 deaths
Sportspeople from Dnipro
People from Yekaterinoslav Governorate
Canadian female sprinters
Athletes (track and field) at the 1928 Summer Olympics
Olympic track and field athletes of Canada
Olympic gold medalists for Canada
Olympic silver medalists for Canada
Jewish Canadian sportspeople
Canadian people of Ukrainian-Jewish descent
Canadian women's basketball players
Canadian women's ice hockey players
Canadian softball players
Sportspeople from Toronto
Jewish female athletes (track and field)
Ukrainian Jews
Jews from the Russian Empire
Emigrants from the Russian Empire to Canada
Ukrainian emigrants to Canada
Persons of National Historic Significance (Canada)
Medalists at the 1928 Summer Olympics
Olympic gold medalists in athletics (track and field)
Olympic silver medalists in athletics (track and field)
Olympic female sprinters